National Institute of Statistics and Census may refer to:

 National Institute of Statistics and Census of Argentina
 National Institute of Statistics and Census of Costa Rica
 National Institute of Statistics and Census of Nicaragua

See also
List of national and international statistical services
National Institute of Statistics (disambiguation)
Instituto Nacional de Estadística (disambiguation)
Instituto Nacional de Estadística e Informática